ESPN College Basketball on ABC is the branding used for broadcasts of NCAA Division I college basketball games produced by ESPN, and televised on ABC. Originally College Basketball on ABC, the ESPN branding has been used since 2006 when parent company Disney merged the ABC Sports division into ESPN Inc.

ABC broadcast selected college basketball games during the 1960s and 1970s, before it began televising them on a regular basis on January 18, 1987, with a game between the LSU Tigers and Kentucky Wildcats). As CBS and NBC were also broadcasting college games at the time, this put the sport on all three major broadcast television networks.

After a five-year hiatus, ABC returned to airing college basketball in 2019 with five games on the network, and has continued to do so since.

Men's Coverage overview

1962, 1973, 1978
ABC first broadcast college basketball games in 1962, when the network aired the NCAA Championship Game on a day-behind delayed basis, as part of its Wide World of Sports anthology series. On December 15, 1973, ABC aired what is considered to be the first telecast of a regular season college basketball game by a major broadcast network. A feature of the afternoon episode of the program, ABC's Wide World of Sports, the game was a special presentation rather than the start of regular telecasts. , and matched UCLA and North Carolina State in St. Louis). Previously, postseason games in the NCAA tournament had been shown on NBC. Regular season college basketball games, though not on ABC, NBC or CBS, had been syndicated to U.S. television stations, such as the so-called ""Game of the Century"" sold to stations nationwide by the TVS Television Network in 1968. ABC (which had recently lost the NBA rights to CBS) televised this game using its former NBA announcing crew of Keith Jackson and Bill Russell.

In the 1977–78 season, C.D. Chesley (who controlled the rights to the Atlantic Coast Conference (ACC) at the time) wanted NBC to televise select ACC games as part of its national package as it had done the previous few years. However, NBC wanted to feature intersectional games. This action greatly upset Chesley, who wound up selling the rights to the ACC Tournament final to ABC. ABC would televise the 1978 ACC Tournament final as part of Wide World of Sports. The game, called by Jim Lampley and Bill Russell, marked the first time Duke University's Blue Devils basketball team played on national television.

1987–2014
When ABC's coverage began in 1987, the network primarily covered the Big Ten, Big 8 and Pac-10 Conferences. By 1991 (around the time NBC was phasing out their own college basketball coverage), ABC ramped up its basketball coverage in an effort to fill the void. As a result, the network also started to cover games focusing on teams from the Atlantic Coast Conference (ACC) and Southeastern Conference (SEC). Otherwise, it was essentially, a considerable hodge-podge with an ACC game one week, or a Pac-10 or Big 10 game the next. The games that were broadcast were a hodge-podge of conference matchups even after the ESPN on ABC brand change, with SEC and Big East match-ups occasionally being shown alongside frequent ACC, Big 12 and Pac-10 match-ups.

ABC's early regular season broadcasts were, for the most part, technically time buys from organizations such as Raycom (particularly, around 1990–91) or sister network ESPN. This in return, was a way to avoid union contracts which require that 100% of network shows had to use crew staff who were network union members. During the early 1990s, Raycom paid ABC US$1.8 million for six weeks of network airtime of 26 regional games. The format allowed Raycom to control the games and sell the advertising.

In the 1987–88 season, ABC did not air any college basketball games during the last three weekends of February due to the network's coverage of the Winter Olympics. As previously mentioned, coverage by ABC steadily increased during the early 1990s; by the 1991–92 season, ABC was carrying regional games in many timeslots on Saturday and Sunday afternoons. By 1997, ABC's presenting sponsor was Paine Webber.

Starting in 1997, coverage of the PGA Tour limited the number of games that the network showed; this continued through 2006. Coverage of the NBA further decreased college basketball coverage on the network when ABC Sports acquired the broadcast rights to the league (through a production arrangement with ESPN) beginning in 2002. Beginning with the 2007 season, all games were rebranded as part of the integration of ABC Sports into ESPN as ESPN on ABC (meaning that all sports telecasts on ABC would exclusively feature ESPN's graphics, music and announcers) and Sunday games were discontinued. From 2007 to 2009, all games began at 3:30 p.m. Eastern Time, which was a departure from the differing broadcast times that were previously assigned to the game telecasts.

From 2010 to 2013, ABC broadcast the semi-finals and finals of the SEC men's basketball tournament. In 2014, ABC only broadcast the semi-final round of the tournament.

2008-09 season

2009-10 season

2010-11 season

2011-12 season

2012-13 season

2013-14 season

2019-present 
For the first time since 2009, ABC returned to airing regular season college basketball games in 2019. The network would air 5 games, starting on December 8, when the Texas Longhorns hosted the Texas A&M Aggies, and has slowly increased since then.

For 2020 and on, ABC continues to air at least 5 games each year.

2019-20 season

2020-21 season

2021-22 season

2022-23 season

Women's coverage overview
Beginning with the 2021 NCAA Division I women's basketball tournament, select women's college basketball games have also aired on ABC. In December 2021, the first regular season women's college basketball game aired on ABC.

2020-21 season

2021-22 season

2022-23 season

Commentators

Currently, Dan Shulman and Jay Bilas are the primary announcing team for men's college basketball, while Beth Mowins and Rebecca Lobo are the primary announcing team for women's college basketball.

In the early years of ABC's regular college basketball coverage, Keith Jackson and Dick Vitale were the primary announcing crew, while Gary Bender was the secondary play-by-play announcer behind Jackson. Meanwhile, Al Michaels did regional games during this period.

When Brent Musburger came over from CBS in late 1990, he started working with Dick Vitale on the main team. Jim Valvano did color commentary on games for ABC for a few years until his death in 1993; Vitale and Valvano were paired as co-analysts on ABC's college basketball broadcasts a few times during the 1991–92 season. In the 1992–93 season, Terry Gannon filled in on a few games for Valvano, who at the time was battling cancer, which would ultimately claim his life in April 1993.

Steve Lavin replaced Dick Vitale as the lead analyst beginning in 2005, as Vitale moved to ESPN's weekly primetime showcase game. From 2010 until 2014, when ABC only aired the SEC men's basketball tournament, Brad Nessler and Jimmy Dykes served as the broadcast team. When college basketball returned to ABC during the 2019-2020 season, a variety of ESPN College Basketball analysts were used, including Dick Vitale.

See also
ESPN on ABC
Men's college basketball on television
College Basketball on ESPN

References

1987 American television series debuts
2019 American television series debuts
ABC Sports
American Broadcasting Company original programming
ABC
ESPN College Basketball
Wide World of Sports (American TV series)
Gray Television
1980s American television series
1990s American television series
2000s American television series
2010s American television series
American television series revived after cancellation